Corticotropin-releasing hormone receptors (CRHRs), also known as corticotropin-releasing factor receptors (CRFRs) are a G protein-coupled receptor family that binds corticotropin-releasing hormone (CRH).  There are two receptors in the family, designated as type 1 and 2, each encoded by a separate gene ( and  respectively).

Function
CRHRs are important mediators in the stress response. Cells in the anterior lobe of the pituitary gland known as corticotropes express the receptors and will secrete adrenocorticotropic hormone (ACTH) when stimulated.  This binding of corticotropin releasing-hormone (CRH) activates the hypothalamic-pituitary-adrenal (HPA) axis, one of the two parts of the fight-or-flight response to stress. CRHRs are also present in other brain areas such as the amygdala, locus coeruleus and hippocampus.  Within the hippocampus, the CRHR1s are most abundant, residing mainly on the pyramidal cells of CA1 and CA3.  Chronic activation of CRHR1s by CRH induced by early life stress has been shown to underlie memory deficits and learning impairments and anxiety in adulthood.

References

External links 
 
 

Corticotropin-releasing hormone